Paul Merton's Palladium Story is a two-part British television series first broadcast on BBC1 on 18 and 25 September 1994. It is presented by Paul Merton who celebrates the history of the London Palladium, in each episode celebrity guests contribute to talking about the history of the venue. On 10 March 2011, just under 17 years after their original broadcast, both episodes were repeated on BBC Four back-to-back.

Episode list

See also
Sunday Night at the London Palladium

References

External links
 
 
 

1990s British documentary television series
1994 British television series debuts
1994 British television series endings
BBC television documentaries
Documentary films about television
English-language television shows